Buffalo Girls is a 1995 American Western television miniseries adapted from the 1990 novel of the same name by Larry McMurtry. Directed by Rod Hardy, it starred Anjelica Huston and Melanie Griffith, with Gabriel Byrne and Peter Coyote. It was nominated for two Golden Globe and several Emmy awards, and won one for sound mixing. This miniseries was first aired on the CBS network over two consecutive nights during the spring of 1995.

Synopsis
A story of the fading Wild West is told from Calamity Jane's point of view, with overlaid narrative to her eldest daughter about Jane's adventures.

Cast
 Anjelica Huston as Calamity Jane
 Melanie Griffith as Dora DuFran
 Sam Elliott as Wild Bill Hickok
 Gabriel Byrne as Ted Blue
 Peter Coyote as Buffalo Bill Cody
 Tracey Walter as Jim Ragg
 Jack Palance as Bartle Bone
 Charlayne Woodard as Doosie
 Reba McEntire as Annie Oakley
 Floyd 'Red Crow' Westerman as No Ears 
 Liev Schreiber as Ogden 
 Russell Means as Sitting Bull

Awards and nominations
Wins:
 Emmy Award for Outstanding Individual Achievement in Sound Mixing for a Drama Miniseries or a Special

Nominations:
 Artios Award for Best Casting for TV miniseries
 Cinema Audio Society Award for Outstanding Individual Achievement in Sound Mixing for a Drama Miniseries or a Special
 Emmy Award for Outstanding Individual Achievement in Art Direction for a Miniseries or a Special
 Emmy Award for Outstanding Individual Achievement in Costume Design for a Miniseries or a Special
 Emmy Award for Outstanding Individual Achievement in Editing for a Miniseries or a Special - Single Camera Production
 Emmy Award for Outstanding Individual Achievement in Hairstyling for a Miniseries or a Special
 Emmy Award for Outstanding Individual Achievement in Makeup for a Miniseries or a Special
 Emmy Award for Outstanding Individual Achievement in Music Composition for a Miniseries or a Special (Dramatic Underscore)
 Emmy Award for Outstanding Individual Achievement in Sound Editing for a Miniseries or a Special
 Emmy Award for Outstanding Lead Actress in a Miniseries or a Special (for Anjelica Huston)
 Emmy Award for Outstanding Miniseries
 Emmy Award for Outstanding Supporting Actor in a Miniseries or a Special (for Sam Elliott)
 Golden Globe Award for Best Performance by an Actor in a Supporting Role in a Series, Mini-Series or Motion Picture Made for TV (for Sam Elliott)
 Golden Globe Award for Best Performance by an Actress in a Supporting Role in a Series, Mini-Series or Motion Picture Made for TV (for Melanie Griffith)
 Screen Actors Guild Award for Outstanding Performance by a Female Actor in a TV Film or Miniseries (for Anjelica Huston)

References

External links
 

1990s American television miniseries
1990s Western (genre) television series
1995 American television series debuts
1995 American television series endings
American biographical series
Cultural depictions of Annie Oakley
Cultural depictions of Buffalo Bill
Cultural depictions of Calamity Jane
Cultural depictions of Sitting Bull
Cultural depictions of Wild Bill Hickok
Television shows based on American novels